Danu is a Hindu primordial goddess. She is mentioned in the Rigveda to be the mother of the eponymous race of Danavas. The word Danu described the primeval waters that this deity perhaps embodied. In later Hinduism, she is described to be the daughter of the Prajapati Daksha and his spouse Panchajani, and the consort of the sage Kashyapa.

Etymology 
As a word for "rain" or "liquid", dānu is compared to Avestan dānu, "river", and further to river names like Don, Danube, Dnieper, Dniestr, etc. There is also a Danu river in Nepal. The "liquid" word is mostly neutral, but appears as feminine in RV 1.54.

Literature

Rigveda 
In the Rigveda (I.32.9), she is identified as the mother of Vritra, the asura slain by Indra.

Padma Purana 
In the Padma Purana, the children of Danu are described:

Brahmanda Purana 
In the Brahmanda Purana, it is stated that while Aditi is habitually righteous, and Diti was habitually strong, Danu habitually practises maya.

See also
Danu (Irish goddess)
Dewi Danu, a Balinese Hindu goddess
Tiamat

References

Asura

Rigvedic deities
Hindu goddesses
Daughters of Daksha